Koebelia is a genus of leafhoppers endemic to western North America. Also called mottled pine leafhoppers, they are 3-5 mm long and are brown or gray with darker spots. The head is wider than the prothorax. They are found on pine trees.

Species 
These five species are in the genus Koebelia:

 Koebelia californica Baker, 1897
 Koebelia coronata Ball, 1909
 Koebelia grossa Ball, 1909
 Koebelia inyoensis Oman, 1971
 Koebelia irrorata Ball, 1909

References 

Cicadellidae genera
Deltocephalinae